Maple GO Station is a train and bus station on GO Transit's Barrie line, located in Maple, Ontario, Canada.  It is Ontario's oldest operating railway station, with passenger service dating back to 1853.

History

Maple Station opened on May 16, 1853, when the service began on the Ontario, Simcoe, and Huron Railroad between Toronto and Machell's Corners (now Aurora).  At the time, the station was named "Richmond Hill", despite being six kilometres west of that community.  Train service was extended to Barrie later in 1853, and to Collingwood in 1855.

The current station building was constructed in 1903 by the Grand Trunk Railway to replace the original Ontario, Simcoe and Huron building, which had burned down.  The Queen Anne style timber frame structure is clad in wood using stick style patterns, and features large gables in its roofline.  It is federally protected by the Heritage Railway Stations Protection Act. The building is also protected under Part V of the Ontario Heritage Act, as part of the Maple Heritage Conservation District.

The building underwent renovations that were completed in January 2014 for  million. It included repairs to the facade and interior, replacement of the floor, and an upgrade to the accessibility ramps. An additional 60 parking spaces were added to the station in the spring of 2015.

The station will undergo a redevelopment starting in 2019 including the addition of a second rail track, new rail platforms with a full canopy, two pedestrian tunnels to connect the new platforms, more parking, and the bus loop will be upgraded.

Services
As of January 2018, train service operates approximately every 15–30 minutes in the morning peak period, every 30 minutes in the afternoon peak period and every hour at other times.  Outside of peak periods, most trains terminate at Aurora with connecting buses for stations further north.

On weekends and holidays, service operates approximately hourly between Aurora and Toronto.  Three daily trains in each direction cover the full route from Barrie to Toronto, while the remainder have bus connections at Aurora station for stations further north.

Connecting transit
York Region Transit:
22 King City
4 Major Mackenzie

In film
 The station was used in a 1981 episode of The Littlest Hobo.

See also

 List of designated heritage railway stations of Canada

References

External links

 Maple GO Station improvements at GO Transit
 CNR Maple
 Historic Sites and Monuments Board of Canada Railway Station Report RSR-139, CNR, Maple, Ontario

GO Transit railway stations
Railway stations in Vaughan
Canadian National Railway stations in Ontario
Designated heritage railway stations in Ontario
Railway stations in Canada opened in 1853